The following lists events in the year 2020 in Saudi Arabia.

Incumbents
Monarch: Salman
Crown Prince: Mohammad bin Salman

Events

January
January 1
 Yemeni rebels release some Saudi prisoners, as UN-led peace talks make progress. 
January 8
Saudi Arabia begins efforts to rebuild power stations in Yemen.

March
2 March – The first case of COVID-19 is confirmed in Qatif, marking the beginning of the pandemic in the country.

April
April 24
Saudi Arabia banned flogging as a judicial punishment.
April 26
Awwad Alawwad announced that, by royal decree, Saudi Arabia would no longer execute individuals for crimes committed while minors, replacing execution with a sentence of 10 years in a juvenile detention facility.

September
 The kingdom's economy contracted 7 percent in the second economic quarter in comparison to the same time last year. The oil sector shrank 5.3 percent this year in part due to a lack of demand as a result of the pandemic. Oil prices decreased to below $20 a barrel in April after the country entered an oil price war. While a truce among the world’s top oil producers has pushed the price of oil up to $40 a barrel, this figure is still almost half the price of oil per barrel at the start of 2020. Furthermore, oil prices are significantly lower than the $76 a barrel the International Monetary Fund (IMF) says Saudi Arabia requires in order to balance its budget this year. In fact, the kingdom obtains more than three-quarters of its earnings from oil. The kingdom’s non-oil sector shrank by 8.2 percent in the second quarter, as quarantine constraints brought business activity to an almost complete standstill. While those restrictions have been eased, the government imposed harsh austerity measures in recent months and according to experts, this may lead to a slow recovery. According to the government, the unemployment rate soared to a record high of 15.4 percent. According to analysts, recovering from such a hit might be more difficult due to budget constraints as a result of declining oil prices. The IMF expects the Saudi economy to contract by about 7 percent this year and increase growth by 3.1 percent in 2021.

November
November 11
The Non–Muslim Cemetery in the Al-Balad district of Jeddah was attacked using an Improvised explosive device that injured several people. The attack took place during the annual Armistice Day commemorations to mark the cessation of hostilities in World War I.

Events by issue

See also

 Saudi Arabia
 History of Saudi Arabia
 Outline of Saudi Arabia

Specific issues
 Saudi Arabian involvement in the Syrian Civil War
 COVID-19 pandemic in Saudi Arabia

References

 
2020s in Saudi Arabia
Years of the 21st century in Saudi Arabia
Saudi Arabia
Saudi Arabia